London Buses route 167 is a Transport for London contracted bus route in London, England. Running between Ilford and Loughton station, it is operated by Stagecoach London.

History
In 1986, the operation of the route was put out to tender, and transferred from London Regional Transport to the Eastern National Omnibus Company. Upon being re-tendered, on 7 March 1992 the route passed to Grey-Green.

Upon being re-tendered, on 9 March 2002 route 167 passed to Docklands Buses. It was included in the September 2006 sale of Docklands Buses to Go-Ahead Group. Docklands Buses retained when re-tendered with a new contract commencing in March 2007. Blue Triangle successfully tendered to retain the route with a new contract commencing on 10 March 2012.

In November 2015, Essex County Council announced that it would withdraw its subsidy for the route. Concerns were immediately raised from local residents and the headteacher of Davenant Foundation School, who said the routes were used by many schoolchildren.

On 11 March 2017 the route was withdrawn between Loughton station and Debden station . Stagecoach London took over operation of the route on the same date from its Barking garage. Following a question from Caroline Russell, the Mayor of London stated that it would cost more than £500,000 per year to keep operating the 167 route to Debden, and the predicted fare income would only cover 40% of that cost. Later that year, colour-coded branding was introduced on the majority of vehicles running the route.

During the summers of 2018 and 2019, the route was to be diverted, because of the reconstruction of Alderton Bridge, via new roads, Brook Road and Brooklyn Avenue, to rejoin the A121.

Current route
Route 167 operates via these primary locations:
 Ilford, Hainault Street
 Ilford station 
 Gants Hill station 
 Barkingside
 Fullwell Cross
 Chigwell station 
 Buckhurst Hill station 
 Loughton station

References

External links

Bus routes in London
Transport in Epping Forest District
Transport in the London Borough of Redbridge